The 1985 Soviet Chess Championship was the 52nd edition of USSR Chess Championship. Held from 22 January to 19 February 1985 in Lviv. The title was won by Mikhail Gurevich. Semifinals took place in Barnaul, Borjomi and Lviv; two First League tournaments (also qualifying to the final) was held at Sverdlovsk and Tashkent.

Qualifying

Semifinals 
Semifinals took place at Barnaul, Borjomi, and Lviv in August 1984.

First League 
Both top five qualified for the final.

Final

Play-off 
First place was shared by Gavrikov, Gurevich and Chemin. The play-off saw all games end in draws. While the chess officials were pondering
what to do next, a journalist announced that there would be no further play and Gurevich would be winner on tie-break from the final contest, what was accepted. So Mikhail Gurevich received the gold medal. Mark Taimanov notes that superior tie-break in the final had never been taken into account before.

References 

USSR Chess Championships
Chess
1985 in chess
1985 in Soviet sport